Gemmula husamaru is a species of sea snail, a marine gastropod mollusk in the family Turridae, the turrids.

Description
The length of the shell attains 32 mm.

Distribution
This marine species occurs off Japan and off Taiwan.

References

 Nomura, S., 1940: Mollusca dredged by the Husa-maru from the Pacific coast of Tiba Prefecture, Japan. Rec Oceanogr Works Japan 12(1): 81-116

External links
 Bishogai Data Base: Gemmula husamaru
  Tucker, J.K. 2004 Catalog of recent and fossil turrids (Mollusca: Gastropoda). Zootaxa 682:1-1295.

husamaru
Gastropods described in 1940